Western Peak is a summit in the U.S. state of Nevada.

Western Peak lies west of the Roberts Mountains, hence the name.

References

Mountains of Eureka County, Nevada